Ruine Katsch is a castle in Styria, Austria. Ruine Katsch is situated at a height of 748 meters.

See also
 List of castles in Austria

References

This article was initially translated from the German Wikipedia.

Castles in Styria